The canton of Châtel-Guyon is an administrative division of the Puy-de-Dôme department, central France. It was created at the French canton reorganisation which came into effect in March 2015. Its seat is in Châtel-Guyon.

It consists of the following communes:
 
Châteaugay
Châtel-Guyon
Enval
Malauzat
Marsat
Ménétrol
Mozac
Volvic

References

Cantons of Puy-de-Dôme